Diana Lorena Taurasi (born June 11, 1982) is an American professional basketball player for the Phoenix Mercury of the Women's National Basketball Association (WNBA), and is considered to be one of the greatest women basketball players of all time. She was drafted by Phoenix first overall in the 2004 WNBA draft. Taurasi has won the WNBA Rookie of the Year Award (2004), three WNBA championships (2007, 2009, and 2014), a historic five Olympic gold medals (2004, 2008, 2012, 2016 and 2020), one WNBA Most Valuable Player Award (2009), two WNBA Finals MVP Awards (2009 and 2014), five scoring titles (2006, 2008, 2009, 2010, and 2011), and three FIBA World Cups (2010, 2014, and 2018). She has also been selected to ten WNBA All-Star teams and fourteen All-WNBA teams (including ten first-team selections). In 2011, she was voted by fans as one of the WNBA's Top 15 Players of All Time, and was named by the league to its 20th and 25th anniversary teams, respectively the WNBA Top 20@20 in 2016 and The W25 in 2021. Also in 2021, she was selected by fans as the league's greatest player of all time. On June 18, 2017, Taurasi became the WNBA all-time leading scorer and on June 27, 2021, became the first player to surpass 9,000 points. Her penchant for scoring in crucial situations has earned her the nickname "White Mamba", coined by Kobe Bryant. Taurasi is one of 11 women to win an Olympic gold medal, an NCAA Championship, a FIBA World Cup gold and a WNBA Championship.

Early life
Taurasi grew up in Chino, California, where she attended and played basketball at Don Antonio Lugo High School. Taurasi's father, Mario, was raised in Argentina. He was a professional soccer player in Italy and played for several years as a goalkeeper. Taurasi's mother, Liliana, is Argentinian. Mario and Liliana Taurasi emigrated from Argentina to the United States before Diana was born. She has an older sister named Jessika.

High school career
Taurasi attended Don Antonio Lugo High School, where she was the recipient of the 2000 Cheryl Miller Award, presented by the Los Angeles Times to the best player in Southern California. She was also named the 2000 Naismith and Parade Magazine National High School Player of the Year, and the 1999 and 2000 Ms. Basketball State Player of the Year. Taurasi finished her prep career ranked fourth in state history with 3,047 points. Taurasi was named a WBCA All-American. She participated in the 2000 WBCA High School All-America Game, where she scored twelve points, and earned MVP honors.

College

Following a highly decorated high school career, Taurasi enrolled at the University of Connecticut and began playing for the women's basketball team during the 2000–2001 season. Taking the court primarily at point guard and shooting guard, she led the team to three consecutive NCAA championships. Leading up to the final championship, her coach, Geno Auriemma, would declare his likelihood of winning with the claim, "We have Diana, and you don't."

Taurasi also received many personal accolades at UConn including the 2003 and 2004 Naismith College Player of the Year awards, the 2003 Wade Trophy, the 2003 and 2004 Honda Sports Award and the 2003 Associated Press Player of the Year award. In addition to the national recognition she received while at UConn, Taurasi was held in legendary status by many Connecticut fans. For example, state senator Thomas Gaffey nominated her to join Prudence Crandall as the state's heroine. She averaged 15.0 points, 4.3 rebounds and 4.5 assists per game in her collegiate career. During her time at UConn, her team compiled a record of 139 wins and 8 losses. In 2006, Taurasi was a member of the inaugural class of inductees to the University of Connecticut women's basketball "Huskies of Honor" recognition program.

WNBA career
Following her collegiate career, Taurasi was selected first overall in the 2004 WNBA draft by the Phoenix Mercury, a team that went 8–26 in the 2003 season. At times in her career, she had to play forward because there were shorter players in the starting five on her team. However, she mainly plays guard. Also, right before the 2004 season, the Mercury acquired all-star Penny Taylor in a dispersal draft, to strengthen their roster.

In her WNBA debut, Taurasi scored 22 points in a 72–66 Mercury loss to the Sacramento Monarchs. For the season, the rookie averaged 17.0 points, 4.4 rebounds and 3.9 assists per game. Although the Mercury did not qualify for the playoffs, Taurasi was named to the Western Conference All Star team and won the WNBA Rookie of the Year Award.

In 2005, Taurasi averaged 16.0 points, 4.2 rebounds and 4.5 assists per game while battling an ankle injury. She was an All Star for the second straight year, but the Mercury faded down the stretch and again missed the playoffs.

Former NBA coach Paul Westhead became the Mercury's head coach prior to the 2006 season and brought his up-tempo style to Phoenix. Their roster was further bolstered by the addition of rookie Cappie Pondexter, the #2 overall selection in the 2006 WNBA draft, forming a Big 3 of Taurasi, Pondexter and Taylor.

2006 would be an historic season for Taurasi as she flourished under Westhead's system, leading the league in scoring and earning a third straight trip to the All Star Game. She broke Katie Smith's league records for points in a season (741 during the 2006 season). In 2006, Taurasi averaged a WNBA record 25.3 points, 4.1 assists and 3.6 rebounds per game, including a career-high 47 points in a triple overtime regular season victory against the Houston Comets (a then league record). During that game she made a WNBA record 8 three-pointers (which has since been tied by Riquna Williams). Taurasi also set a WNBA record with 121 three-pointers made in a single season. The Mercury finished 18–16, but after losing a tie-breaker with Houston and Seattle, missed the playoffs.

In 2007, Taurasi finally reached the WNBA playoffs. In the first round, the Mercury eliminated the Seattle Storm two games to none. Next, they swept the San Antonio Silver Stars in a hard-fought two-game series and Taurasi advanced to her first WNBA Finals, against the defending champion Detroit Shock. Taurasi, Pondexter and Taylor led the Mercury to their first WNBA title. With this victory Taurasi became the seventh player ever to win an NCAA title, a WNBA title, and an Olympic gold medal. Others who had achieved this were Ruth Riley, Sheryl Swoopes, Cynthia Cooper-Dyke, and fellow Huskies Swin Cash, Kara Wolters, and Sue Bird, with further players added to the list in following years.

Taurasi was a member of the USA women's 2004, 2008, 2012, and 2016 gold medal Olympic Basketball Teams.

In the 2009 season, Taurasi was named the WNBA MVP and later led the Phoenix Mercury to its second WNBA championship in three years by beating the Indiana Fever, three games to two, as Taurasi was named the WNBA Finals MVP. Taurasi is one of only two players (the other being Cynthia Cooper-Dyke), to win the season scoring title, the season MVP award, a WNBA Championship and the finals MVP in the same season. 

In 2011, alongside being selected to her 7th All-WNBA First Team, she was voted one of the Top 15 players in the fifteen-year history of the WNBA by fans.

In 2012, Taurasi had an injury-riddled season, playing only eight games. She had to sit out the rest of the season with a strained left hip flexor. The Mercury proceeded to finish the season 7–27 as the second worst team in the league.

In 2013, Taurasi returned healthy for the season, she played 32 games and averaged 20+ ppg for the sixth time in her career. The Mercury finished 3rd in the western conference with a 19–15. They defeated the Los Angeles Sparks 2–1 in the first round, advancing to the conference finals, but would lose to the Minnesota Lynx in a 2-game sweep.

Entering the 2014 season, Taurasi reached the number two spot in career points per game, fifth place in career points, and ninth in career assists. In the 2014 season, with a supporting cast of all-star power forward Candice Dupree (who was traded to the Mercury in 2010), rising star Brittney Griner (who was drafted 1st overall in the 2013 WNBA draft) and the arrival of new head coach Sandy Brondello, the Phoenix Mercury finished 29–5, setting the record for most wins in a regular season, earning the top seed in the western conference. In the playoffs they advanced all the way to the WNBA Finals where they would sweep the Chicago Sky earning Taurasi her 3rd championship. Taurasi also won the WNBA Finals MVP for the second time in her career.

On February 3, 2015, Taurasi announced that she would sit out the 2015 WNBA season at the request of her Russian Premier League team, UMMC Ekaterinburg. The team offered to pay Taurasi more than her WNBA salary to skip the 2015 WNBA season. For the 2014 WNBA season, Taurasi made just under the league maximum of $107,000. But she makes 14 times that – approximately $1.5 million – playing overseas.
 

Taurasi returned to the Mercury for the 2016 WNBA season. Taurasi averaged 17.8 ppg helping the Mercury to another playoff berth with a 16–18 record. With the WNBA's new playoff format in effect, the Mercury were the number 8 seed in the league, facing the Indiana Fever in the first round. The Mercury advanced to the second round beating the Fever in the first round elimination game as Taurasi scored 20 points. During that game, Taurasi made her 113th playoff career three-pointer, becoming the all-time WNBA leader in playoff career three-pointers made (passing Becky Hammon). In the second round elimination game, the Mercury beat the New York Liberty advancing to the semifinals (the last round before the WNBA finals) with Taurasi scoring a game-high 30 points in the win. In the semi-finals, the Mercury would face the championship defending Minnesota Lynx in the best-of-5 series and would be swept 3 games to 0.

In May 2017, Taurasi signed a multi-year contract extension with the Mercury. Later that month, Taurasi became the first player in league history reach 7,000 points, 1,500 rebounds and 1,500 assists following an 85–62 victory over the Indiana Fever. On June 18, 2017, Taurasi became the WNBA's all-time leading scorer, passing Tina Thompson's old record. Taurasi would be selected into the 2017 WNBA All-Star Game, making it her eighth career all-star game appearance. The Mercury would finish with an 18–16 record as the fifth seed in the league. In the first round elimination game, Taurasi 14 points in a 79–69 win over the Seattle Storm. In the second round elimination game, the Mercury defeated the Connecticut Sun 88–83, Taurasi scored 23 points in the win. The Mercury advanced past the second round for the second season in a row, but were eliminated by the Los Angeles Sparks in a 3-game sweep.

In the 2018 season-opener on May 18, 2018, against the Dallas Wings, Taurasi became the first player in WNBA history to make 1,000 3-pointers. On June 5, 2018, Taurasi became the first player in WNBA history to score 8,000 points in an 80–74 victory against the Liberty. On July 8, 2018, Taurasi became the league's all-time leader in field goals made in an 84–77 victory against the Connecticut Sun, surpassing Tina Thompson. Taurasi would also earn her ninth career all-star appearance after being voted into the 2018 WNBA All-Star Game. On August 1, 2018, Taurasi scored a season-high 37 points in a 104–93 victory against the Las Vegas Aces. The Mercury finished off the season 20–14 with the number 5 seed in the league. In the first round elimination game, the Mercury defeated the Dallas Wings 101–83. Taurasi scored 26 points in the win. In the second round elimination game, the Mercury defeated the Connecticut Sun 96–86, advancing to the semi-finals for the third year in a row, they would face off against the Seattle Storm. Down 2–0, the Mercury came back to tie up the series 2–2. In game 5, the Mercury lost 94–84, ending their season.

In April 2019, the Mercury announced that Taurasi's spouse, Penny Taylor, had been hired as an assistant coach.

Taurasi started the 2019 WNBA season on the injured list after undergoing back surgery. Taurasi would continue to be hobbled throughout the season, this time with a hamstring injury which limited her to only 6 games played for the season with very minimal playing time. Without a healthy Taurasi, the Mercury barely made the playoffs as the number 8 seed with a 15–19 record. The Mercury were eliminated in the first round elimination game 105-76 by the Chicago Sky.

In September 2019, Taurasi—who remained under contract with the Mercury—confirmed that she intended to play for the team in 2020.

In 2020, the season was delayed and shortened to 22 games in a bubble at IMG Academy due to the COVID-19 pandemic. Taurasi would come back healthy for the season and played 19 of the 22 games, on August 23, 2020, Taurasi scored a season-high 34 points in an 88–87 victory over the Washington Mystics while honoring the late Kobe Bryant on his birthday by wearing number 8 along with his last name on her jersey. The Mercury had finished 13–9 as the number 5 seed, they defeated the Washington Mystics 85–84 in the first round elimination game, however they would get eliminated by the Minnesota Lynx in the second round elimination game by a final score of 80–79.

In February 2021, Taurasi re-signed with the Mercury on a 2-year deal.

Taurasi injured her ankle and broke a bone in her foot late in the Mercury's 2021 season and opted to sit out due to the injury in the first single elimination game against the New York Liberty. She returned for the second round single elimination game against the reigning champions Seattle Storm which the Mercury won in overtime. In the best of five semi final series against the Las Vegas Aces. Taurasi led her team to a tie series after a Game 1 loss (by 4 points) making history. At 39 years old, Taurasi made history as the oldest player in league history to score an over 30 point game. She put up 37 points on 10 of 13 shooting — including eight of 11 attempted three-pointers. Her eight three-pointers were the second-most made in a playoff game in the WNBA's postseason history. Phoenix Mercury coach, Sandy Brondello, noted that Taurasi still had pain in her ankle but managed to play through it and play through it she did, playing her heart out in a Game 3 win and Game 4 loss. On Oct.8, 2021, shortly before the birth of her daughter Taurasi led her team to a 87-84 Game 5 win making her 16-2 overall in win or take all games with 24 points, a crucial late game block and 14 clutch 4th quarter points. Taurasi plans on coming back to the WNBA despite retiring.

Overseas career
Taurasi's international career began in 2005 when she played for Dynamo Moscow, a team that had been dominant in the Russian league until the late 90s, and even the 2005 runner-up, but was slowly declining at that time. The Euroleague tournament ended in the quarter-finals, where Dynamo was eliminated by former champions CSKA Samara.
In 2006 Taurasi was recruited to play for the Russian team Spartak Moscow. The team had finished in eleventh place in the Russian league when Shabtai von Kalmanovich decided to buy the team. Kalmanovich was a successful business man with various interests, including women's basketball. He had stopped in to see a local women's basketball team in Yekaterinburg, and "literally fell in love with the point guard, Anna Arkhipova". He ended up buying that team, but later decided to buy the Spartak Moscow Region team, and turn it into a top team. He arranged to add a number of top-notch players, who had earned seven Olympic medals between them. Many of the players were European, but the team also included Australian Lauren Jackson and Americans Sue Bird and Taurasi.

The team would go on to win four consecutive Euroleague championships from 2007 to 2010, and Taurasi was named Final Four MVP in 2009 and 2010.

In 2010 Taurasi played for Turkish champion Fenerbahçe, helping the team to repeat winning the national league. On December 24, 2010, Taurasi's lawyers revealed that she had tested positive for a mild stimulant; according to her lawyer, Howard Jacobs, the positive test came from an "A" sample, and that testing had been requested on a second "B" sample. Jacobs also was quick to point out that the substance Taurasi tested positive for "was not a steroid or recreational drug." Until the "B" sample could be tested, Taurasi was provisionally suspended from the Turkish league. In a statement, the Turkish basketball association revealed that the WADA-list banned substance was modafinil. On February 16, 2011, Taurasi was finally cleared of doping allegations. ABC News indicated Taurasi was absolved from all doping allegations and could rejoin her Istanbul team following the retraction of the Turkish laboratory on its earlier finding on the former UConn star's urine samples.

In the 2011–2012 season Taurasi played for Galatasaray, the other major team from Istanbul and Fenerbahçe's long time rival; Taurasi joined WNBA stars Epiphanny Prince, Sylvia Fowles, Tina Charles and Ticha Penicheiro. The team ended winning the Turkish Cup but lost to Fenerbahçe in the League Final and was eliminated in the Final Eight quarter-final round of the 2011–12 EuroLeague again losing a decisive match to Fenerbahçe.

On May 16, 2012, Taurasi signed a contract with UMMC Ekaterinburg, joining fellow WNBA star Candace Parker. The team dominated national and international competitions, winning the 2012–13 EuroLeague (second time for the club), Russian Championship and Russian Cup.

Season 2013–2014 saw the UMMC team repeating in winning Russian Championship and Cup, but falling short in Eurolegue competition, losing in the semifinal game against eventual champion Galatasaray; these occurrences repeated in 2014–2015 season with UMMC losing in the Euroleague final against Czech's USK Praha, in a game where Taurasi had to sit out with a broken hand.

The injury and the consequent loss in the Euroleague final had a big role in the decision of UMMC club to offer Taurasi a deal to skip her 2015 WNBA season to rest. Taurasi chose to accept the deal, giving up the WNBA title defense and returning to Phoenix Mercury only in 2016; her decision spread a big debate in the United States about salary policies in women's basketball compared to Europe and China, where women's teams receive governmental support.

In 2015–2016, Taurasi was back to UMMC, leading the team to its third (and her sixth personal) Euroleague title, while also earning MVP honors.

In 2016–2017, Taurasi would once again return to UMMC, helping the team to its eleventh league championship. Though expected to play through the end of the 2017–2018 season with the team, Taurasi announced her retirement from European competition in December 2017.

National team career
Taurasi was a member of the United States women's U18 team which won the gold medal at the FIBA Americas Championship in Mar Del Plata, Argentina. The event was held in July 2000, when Team USA defeated Cuba to win the championship. In the closest match of the tournament, the semifinal game against Brazil, Taurasi connected on seven of her eleven three-point attempts and ended the game with 26 points. She averaged 12.6 points per game and led the team with assists with 5.46 per game. Taurasi has also earned a bronze medal as a member of the 2001 U.S. junior World Championship team, and a gold medal as a member of the 2000 U.S. Women's junior World Championship qualifying team.

On May 12, 2004, Taurasi was selected to compete at the 2004 Olympics in Athens, Greece with the United States national team. She helped Team USA capture the gold medal, defeating Australia in the championship game. Taurasi represented the United States as a member of the 2008 Olympic team at the 2008 Summer Games in Beijing, China, where she started all eight games and helped lead the USA to the gold medal.

Taurasi was the second leading scorer on the U.S. national basketball team at the 2006 FIBA World Championship held in São Paulo, Brazil. The Americans earned the bronze medal.

Taurasi was invited to the USA Basketball women's national team training camp in the fall of 2009. The team selected to participate at the 2010 FIBA World Championship and the 2012 Olympics was primarily chosen from these players. At the conclusion of the training camp, the team traveled to Ekaterinburg, Russia, where they competed in the 2009 UMMC Ekaterinburg International Invitational.

Taurasi was named as one of the national team members to represent the U.S. national team in the WNBA versus USA Basketball. This game replaces the WNBA All-Star game with WNBA All-Stars versus USA Basketball, as part of the preparation for the FIBA World Championship for Women to be held in the Czech Republic during September and October 2010. Taurasi was selected to be a member of the national team for the World Championships. The team was coached by Geno Auriemma. Because many team members were still playing in the WNBA until just prior to the event, the team had only one day of practice with the entire team before leaving for Ostrava and Karlovy Vary. Even with limited practice, the team managed to win its first game against Greece by 26 points. The team continued to dominate with victory margins exceeding 20 points in the first five games. Several players shared scoring honors, with Swin Cash, Angel McCoughtry, Maya Moore, Taurasi, Lindsay Whalen, and Sylvia Fowles all ending as high scorer in the first few games. The sixth game was against undefeated Australia — Team USA jumped out to a 24-point lead and ultimately prevailed 83–75. The Americans won their next two games by over 30 points, before facing the host team, the Czech Republic, in the championship game. Team USA had a five-point lead at halftime, which the Czech team then cut to three points, but never got closer. The U.S. team went on to win the championship and gold medal. Taurasi led the team in scoring with 12.0 points per game and was second on the team with 23 assists.

Taurasi was one of 21 finalists for the 2012 US women's Olympic team roster. The twenty WNBA players, plus collegiate player (Brittney Griner), were selected by the USA Basketball women's national team plater selection committee to compete for the final roster which represented the US at the 2012 Olympics in London. Taurasi would win her third gold medal as the United States defeated France for the gold medal.

Taurasi played for Team USA at the 2016 Olympics in Rio, earning her fourth gold medal while helping the United States overcome Spain 101–72 in the final. Taurasi was a key member of the gold medal-winning 2020 US women's Olympic team in Tokyo, earning Taurasi a record fifth gold medal. Taurasi joins US Olympic teammate Sue Bird as the only two Olympic basketball players of any gender to win five Olympic gold medals.

Personal life
Taurasi is married to former teammate Penny Taylor.  After 8 years of dating, Taurasi wed her former teammate, who at the time was the Phoenix Mercury Director of Player Development and Performance on May 13, 2017. She later told People magazine in an interview “It was the most amazing and beautiful day of our lives. To be able to share our love with family and close friends meant the world to us.”

On March 1, 2018, Taylor gave birth to the couple's son, Leo Michael Taurasi-Taylor.

Taylor expected to give birth to the couple's second child on October 6, 2021, but the baby was late. After a Game 4 loss of the semifinals, Taurasi played in a winner-take-all Game 5 that would decide whether the Phoenix Mercury would play in the 2021 WNBA finals. After a Game 5 win on October 8, 2021, Taurasi had a message for Taylor in her post-game interview, closing it with "Hold it in babe, I'm coming". Taurasi then flew from Las Vegas, where the game took place, back to Phoenix, arriving in time to witness Taylor give birth on October 9, 2021, at 4:24am to the couple's first daughter.

Career statistics

University of Connecticut

|-
| style="text-align:left;"| 2000–01
| style="text-align:left;"| Connecticut
| 33 || 14 || 23.9 || .444 || .386 || .878 || 3.2 || 3.3 || 1.2 || 0.9 || 2.2 || 10.9
|-
| style="text-align:left;"| 2001–02
| style="text-align:left;"| Connecticut
| 39 || 39 || 29.0 || .494 || .440 || .828 || 4.1 || 5.3 || 1.3 || 1.2 || 2.1 || 14.5
|-
| style="text-align:left;"| 2002–03
| style="text-align:left;"| Connecticut
| 37 || 37 || 31.9 || .476 || .350 || .815 || 6.1 || 4.4 || 0.9 || 1.2 || 3.1 || 17.9
|-
| style="text-align:left;"| 2003–04
| style="text-align:left;"| Connecticut
| 35 || 35 || 31.9 || .456 || .390 || .795 || 4.0 || 4.9 || 1.5 || 0.8 || 2.4 || 16.2
|- style="background:skyBlue;"
| style="text-align:left;"| Career
|
| 144 || 125 || 29.3 || .469 || .392 || .819 || 4.4 || 4.5 || 1.2 || 1.0 || 2.5 || 15.0
|}

WNBA regular season

|-
| style="text-align:left;"| 2004
| style="text-align:left;"| Phoenix
| 34 || 34 || 33.2 || .416 || .330 || .710 || 4.4 || 3.9 || 1.3 || 0.7 || 2.7 || 17.0
|-
| style="text-align:left;"| 2005
| style="text-align:left;"| Phoenix
| 33 || 33 || 33.0 || .410 || .313 || .801 || 4.2 || 4.5 || 1.2 || 0.8 || 3.4 || 16.0
|-
| style="text-align:left;"| 2006
| style="text-align:left;"| Phoenix
| 34 || 34 || 33.9 || .452 || .397 || .781 || 3.6 || 4.1 || 1.2 || 0.8 || 2.3 || bgcolor="EOCEF2" | 25.3 
|-
|style="text-align:left;background:#afe6ba;"| 2007†
| style="text-align:left;"| Phoenix
| 32 || 32 || 32.0 || .440 || .367 || .835 || 4.2 || 4.3 || 1.4 || 1.1 || 2.6 || 19.2
|-
| style="text-align:left;"| 2008
| style="text-align:left;"| Phoenix
| 34 || 34 || 31.9 || .446 || .360 || .870 || 5.1 || 3.6 || 1.4 || 1.4 || 2.4 || style="background:#D3D3D3"|24.1°
|-
|style="text-align:left;background:#afe6ba;"| 2009†
| style="text-align:left;"| Phoenix
| 31 || 31 || 31.5 || .461 || .407 || .894 || 5.7 || 3.5 || 1.2 || 1.4 || 2.7 || style="background:#D3D3D3"|20.4°
|-
| style="text-align:left;"| 2010
| style="text-align:left;"| Phoenix
| 31 || 31 || 32.2 || .427 || .374 || .912 || 4.3 || 4.7|| 1.2 || 0.6 || 3.6 || style="background:#D3D3D3"|22.6°
|-
| style="text-align:left;"| 2011
| style="text-align:left;"| Phoenix
| 32 || 32 || 30.2 || .449 || .395 || .903 || 3.2 || 3.6 || 0.8 || 0.6 || 3.0 || style="background:#D3D3D3"|21.6°
|-
| style="text-align:left;"| 2012
| style="text-align:left;"| Phoenix
| 8 || 8 || 59.8 || .436 || .395 || .900 || 1.6 || 2.3 || 0.5 || 0.5 || 1.8 || 14.0
|-
| style="text-align:left;"| 2013
| style="text-align:left;"| Phoenix
| 32 || 32 || 32.3 || .456 || .347 || .854 || 4.2 || 6.2 || 0.7 || 0.5 || 3.6 || 20.3
|-
|style="text-align:left;background:#afe6ba;"| 2014†
| style="text-align:left;"| Phoenix
| 33 || 33 || 32.3 || .454 || .365 || .874 || 3.8 || style="background:#D3D3D3"|5.6° || 0.7 || 0.3 || 2.6 || 16.2
|-
| style="text-align:left;"| 2016
| style="text-align:left;"| Phoenix
| 33 || 33 || 29.8 || .396 || .350 || .909 || 3.0 || 3.9 || 0.9 || 0.1 || 2.6 || 17.8
|-
| style="text-align:left;"| 2017
| style="text-align:left;"| Phoenix
| 31 || 31 || 28.5 || .400 || .384 || .912 || 3.0 || 2.7 || 0.5 || 0.3 || 2.0 || 17.9
|-
| style="text-align:left;"| 2018
| style="text-align:left;"| Phoenix
| 33 || 33 || 30.0 || .446 || .383 || style="background:#D3D3D3"|.925° || 3.5 || 5.3 || 0.9 || 0.2 || 2.5 || 20.7
|-
| style="text-align:left;"| 2019
| style="text-align:left;"| Phoenix
| 6 || 6 || 21.4 || .103 || .042 || .944 || 3.2 || 5.3 || 0.3 || 0.1 || 2.1 || 4.3
|-
| style="text-align:left;"| 2020
| style="text-align:left;"| Phoenix
| 19 || 19 || 28.1 || .409 || .365 || .912 || 4.2 || 4.5 || 1.0 || 0.4 || 2.7 || 18.7
|-
| style="text-align:left;"| 2021
| style="text-align:left;"| Phoenix
| 16 || 16 || 28.4 || .366 || .339 || .861 || 4.4 || 4.9 || 0.2 || 0.6 || 2.9 || 15.2
|-
| style="text-align:left;"| 2022
| style="text-align:left;"| Phoenix
| 31 || 31 || 31.0 || .373 || .337 || .894 || 3.4 || 3.8 || 0.7 || 0.6 || 2.7 || 16.7
|- style="background:skyBlue;"
| style="text-align:left;"| Career
|
| 503 || 503 || 31.0 || .427 || .363 || .872 || 3.9 || 4.3 || 1.0 || 0.7 || 2.7 || 19.3
|}

WNBA Playoffs

|-
|style="text-align:left;background:#afe6ba;"| 2007†
| style="text-align:left;"| Phoenix
| 9 || 9 || 33.2 || .504 || .390 || .731 || 4.3 || 3.0 || 1.4 || 0.8 || 2.0 || 19.9
|-
|style="text-align:left;background:#afe6ba;"| 2009†
| style="text-align:left;"| Phoenix
| 11 || 11 || 32.9 || .451 || .365 || .893 || 5.9 || 3.8 || 0.7 || 1.3 || 3.0 || style="background:#D3D3D3"|22.3°
|-
| style="text-align:left;"| 2010
| style="text-align:left;"| Phoenix
| 4 || 4 || 31.3 || .473 || .542 || .818 || 5.3 || 3.8 || 1.8 || 0.8 || 4.0 || 18.5
|-
| style="text-align:left;"| 2011
| style="text-align:left;"| Phoenix
| 5 || 5 || 31.2 || .398  || .286  || .929 || 3.2 || 2.4 || 0.2 || 0.2 || 2.4 || 20.0
|-
| style="text-align:left;"| 2013
| style="text-align:left;"| Phoenix
| 5 || 5 || 37.2 || .333  || .176  || .950  || 5.2 || 6.0 || 1.6 || 0.2 || 3.0 || 20.8
|-
|style="text-align:left;background:#afe6ba;"| 2014†
| style="text-align:left;"| Phoenix
| 8 || 8 || 32.4 || .492  || .386  || .853 || 4.3 || 5.8 || 1.0 || 0.5 || 3.9 || 21.9
|-
| style="text-align:left;"| 2016
| style="text-align:left;"| Phoenix
| 5 || 5 || 30.7 || .515 || .432 || .970 || 2.6 || 2.8 || 0.2|| 0.6 || 2.0 || 23.6
|-
| style="text-align:left;"| 2017
| style="text-align:left;"| Phoenix
| 5 || 5 || 31.8 || .409|| .353 || .769 || 2.8 || 3.8 || 0.6 || 0.0 || 2.0 || 17.2
|-
| style="text-align:left;"| 2018
| style="text-align:left;"| Phoenix
| 7 || 7 || 35.3 || .477|| .419 || .864 || 4.4 || 6.0 || 0.8 || 0.5 || 2.2 || 21.0
|-
| style="text-align:left;"| 2020
| style="text-align:left;"| Phoenix
| 2 || 2 || 35.0 || .471 || .476 || 1.000 || 4.0 || 7.5 || 0.5 || 0.0 || 2.0 || 25.5
|-
| style="text-align:left;"| 2021
| style="text-align:left;"| Phoenix
| 10 || 10 || 30.5 || .391 || .347 || .884 || 3.5 || 2.9 || 0.5 || 0.6 || 3.0 || 17.6
|- style="background:skyBlue;"
| style="text-align:left;"| Career
|
| 71 || 71 || 32.7 || .446 || .374 || .881 || 4.3 || 4.1 || 0.9 || 0.6 || 2.7 || 20.5
|}

Euroleague

|-
| style="text-align:left;"| 2005–06
| style="text-align:left;"| Dynamo Moscow
| 9 || 9 || 28.4 || .400 || .419 || .625 || 4.1 || 2.2 || 0.9 || 0.3 || 1.9 || 11.4
|-
| style="text-align:left;"| 2006–07
| style="text-align:left;"| Spartak Moscow
| 12 || 12 || 29.3 || .417 || .438 || .652 || 5.3 || 2.1 || 0.7 || 0.5 || 1.9 || 13.1
|-
| style="text-align:left;"| 2007–08
| style="text-align:left;"| Spartak Moscow
| 14 || 14 || 30.6 || .485 || .481 || .872 || 4.9 || 4.4 || 1.3 || 0.6 || 2.4 || 16.8
|-
| style="text-align:left;"| 2008–09
| style="text-align:left;"| Spartak Moscow
| 17 || 17 || 31.9 || .485 || .457 || .831 || 5.6 || 3.8 || 1.4 || 0.3 || 4.0 || 20.5
|-
| style="text-align:left;"| 2009–10
| style="text-align:left;"| Spartak Moscow
| 16 || 16 || 30.3 || .496 || .446 || .853  || 5.7 || 3.8 || 1.6 || 0.3 || 2.7 || 24.9
|-
| style="text-align:left;"| 2010–11
| style="text-align:left;"| Fenerbahçe
| 7 || 7 || 33.7 || .492 || .515 || .886 || 5.4 || 4.7 || 1.1 || 0.0 || 2.4 || 24.6
|-
| style="text-align:left;"| 2011–12
| style="text-align:left;"| Galatasaray
| 18 || 18 || 30.4 || .451 || .440 || .900 || 4.4 || 3.1 || 0.9 || 0.2 || 2.9 || 20.9
|-
| style="text-align:left;"| 2012–13
| style="text-align:left;"| UMMC Ekaterinburg
| 17 || 17 || 29.2 || .439 || .394 || .895 || 4.4 || 4.7 || 0.6 || 0.5 || 2.4 || 15.5
|-
| style="text-align:left;"| 2013–14
| style="text-align:left;"| UMMC Ekaterinburg
| 14 || 14 || 29.5 || .500 || .481 || .789 || 3.3 || 5.0 || 0.8 || 0.1 || 2.4 || 15.0
|-
| style="text-align:left;"| 2014–15
| style="text-align:left;"| UMMC Ekaterinburg
| 14 || 14 || 31.0 || .479 || .511 || .844 || 4.2 || 5.9 || 1.1 || 0.1 || 2.3 || 16.9
|-
| style="text-align:left;"| 2015–16
| style="text-align:left;"| UMMC Ekaterinburg
| 19 || 19 || 32.1 || .461  || .432  || .905 || 5.0 || 4.2 || 0.9 || 0.2 || 2.6 || 20.9
|-
| style="text-align:left;"| 2016–17
| style="text-align:left;"| UMMC Ekaterinburg
| 15 || 15 || 23.6 || .488  || .455  || .865 || 1.9 || 2.8 || 0.8 || 0.1 || 1.1 || 17.9
|- style="background:skyBlue;"
| style="text-align:left;"| Career
|
| 172 || 172 || 30.0 || .466 || .455 || .826 || 4.5 || 3.9 || 1.0 || 0.2 || 2.4 || 18.2
|}

Filmography

See also

 UConn Huskies women's basketball
 2003–04 Connecticut Huskies women's basketball team
 List of athletes with the most appearances at Olympic Games
 List of Connecticut women's basketball players with 1000 points
 List of Connecticut Huskies women's basketball players with 500 assists
 List of WNBA career scoring leaders
 List of WNBA career assists leaders
 List of Women's National Basketball Association season scoring leaders

References

Further reading
 Kelli Anderson, "The Trials Of Diana Taurasi,"  Sports Illustrated, September 12, 2011.

External links

WNBA Player 2004 Draft Prospectus
fenerbahce.org Profile
USA Basketball bio
Jockbio Bio 
UConn bio
galatasaray.org Bio

1982 births
Living people
All-American college women's basketball players
American expatriate basketball people in Russia
American expatriate basketball people in Turkey
American people of Argentine descent
American people of Italian descent
American women's basketball players
Basketball players at the 2004 Summer Olympics
Basketball players at the 2008 Summer Olympics
Basketball players at the 2012 Summer Olympics
Basketball players at the 2016 Summer Olympics
Basketball players at the 2020 Summer Olympics
Basketball players from California
Fenerbahçe women's basketball players
Galatasaray S.K. (women's basketball) players
Lesbian sportswomen
LGBT basketball players
LGBT people from California
American LGBT sportspeople
Medalists at the 2004 Summer Olympics
Medalists at the 2008 Summer Olympics
Medalists at the 2012 Summer Olympics
Medalists at the 2016 Summer Olympics
Medalists at the 2020 Summer Olympics
Olympic gold medalists for the United States in basketball
People from Chino, California
Phoenix Mercury draft picks
Phoenix Mercury players
Point guards
Sportspeople from Glendale, California
Sportspeople from San Bernardino County, California
UConn Huskies women's basketball players
Women's National Basketball Association All-Stars
Women's National Basketball Association first-overall draft picks
21st-century American LGBT people
United States women's national basketball team players